Milan Hurtala (16 June 1946 – 20 March 2021) was a Slovak rower. He competed in the men's coxed eight event at the 1968 Summer Olympics. Hurtala died of COVID-19 during the pandemic in Slovakia.

References

External links

1946 births
2021 deaths
Slovak male rowers
Olympic rowers of Czechoslovakia
Rowers at the 1968 Summer Olympics
Sportspeople from Bratislava
Deaths from the COVID-19 pandemic in Slovakia